Samuel William Alvey (born May 6, 1986) is an American professional mixed martial artist, who competed in the Middleweight division of the Ultimate Fighting Championship (UFC). A professional MMA competitor since 2008, Alvey has also formerly competed for Bellator, King of the Cage, the MFC, and was a contestant on The Ultimate Fighter 16: Team Carwin vs. Team Nelson.

Background
Originally from Waterford, Wisconsin, Alvey competed in football and wrestling at Waterford Union High School and was also a talented musician. Alvey played trumpet in the school's marching band and went on to Lakeland College to play the trumpet semi-professionally. In college, Alvey began competing in pankration before eventually transitioning into a career in mixed martial arts.

Mixed martial arts career

Early career
Alvey began his amateur career in 2007, and was defeated via TKO in the second round of his first amateur bout. He rebounded to win his next two, before turning professional in July 2008. Alvey's early career took place entirely in the state of Wisconsin, where he posted an early 11–1 record, which included multiple wins in the King of the Cage promotion.

Bellator
Following a win at Light Heavyweight against Bellator MMA fighter and veteran Jason Guida, Alvey was on a three-fight winning streak and was signed by Bellator. His debut match was at Middleweight against future Bellator Welterweight Tournament Champion Karl Amoussou at Bellator 45. Early on, Amoussou bloodied Alvey with varied strikes and worked towards an armbar, though as the fight progressed, Amoussou started to tire and Alvey soon gained control of the fight in the second round and managed to secure a takedown late in the third round. After three rounds, Alvey was victorious via split decision.

Following his win over Amoussou, Alvey was named as a participant in Bellator Season Five Middleweight Tournament, where he faced Vitor Vianna. The fight saw Alvey utilize his reach advantage early in the fight, but by round two, Vianna started to control the bout, having taken Alvey down to the ground. At the end of the second round, Vianna had locked in a rear-naked choke, but time expired, allowing Alvey to make it into the third round. The third round was regarded as much closer and the fight went a decision. Alvey lost via split decision and was eliminated from the tournament.

The Ultimate Fighter
Alvey was then selected to be a part of The Ultimate Fighter: Team Carwin vs. Team Nelson, where he dropped down to welterweight for the first time. In the opening episode, he fought Leo Kuntz to get into the house. Alvey won via quick first-round knockout after a single, clean right hook. During the fighter picks, Shane Carwin selected Alvey first overall. In the third episode, Alvey was selected by Carwin to fight Joey Rivera of Team Nelson. Rivera started the fight by landing two quick head kicks and then landed a takedown. Alvey then had to defend against a guillotine choke and a triangle choke in the first round. In the second round, Alvey started to land more strikes, but was rocked by another head kick from Rivera. Though Alvey survived to go to a decision, Rivera was victorious via majority decision (19-19, 20–18, 20–18).

Maximum Fighting Championship
Alvey's MFC debut was against Elvis Mutapčić for the MFC Middleweight Championship at MFC 36. He lost via unanimous decision. Alvey defeated UFC & Bellator veteran Jay Silva at MFC 37 via TKO in round three. He then won the MFC Middleweight Championship by defeating Jason South and successfully defended it once against Wes Swofford before moving to the UFC.

Ultimate Fighting Championship
In June 2014, it was announced that Alvey had signed with the UFC. He made his debut on August 16, 2014 against Tom Watson at UFC Fight Night 47. He lost the back-and-forth fight via unanimous decision.

For his second fight with the promotion, Alvey faced Dylan Andrews on November 8, 2014 at UFC Fight Night 55. He won the fight via knockout due to punches in the first round.

Alvey faced Cezar Ferreira on February 22, 2015 at UFC Fight Night 61. Alvey won the fight via knockout in the first round. Subsequently, Alvey won a Performance of the Night bonus.

Alvey faced Dan Kelly on May 10, 2015 at UFC Fight Night 65. Alvey won the fight via TKO in the first round.

Alvey faced Derek Brunson on August 8, 2015 at UFC Fight Night 73. He lost the fight by TKO in the first round.

Alvey was expected to face Daniel Sarafian on February 21, 2016 at UFC Fight Night 83. However, Alvey pulled out of the bout in late December after sustaining a broken jaw and was replaced by Oluwale Bamgbose.

Alvey next faced Elias Theodorou on June 18, 2016 at UFC Fight Night 89. The bout remained on the feet for nearly all of its duration in a largely uneventful fight where neither fighter was able to deliver any significant offense. He lost the fight via unanimous decision.

After sustaining virtually no damage during his previous fight, Alvey was quickly rescheduled and faced promotional newcomer Eric Spicely on July 13, 2016 at UFC Fight Night 91. He won the fight via submission in first round.

Alvey competed in his third bout in three months as he faced Kevin Casey on August 27, 2016 at UFC on Fox 21. He won the fight via TKO in the second round.

Alvey again made a quick return to the cage and faced Alex Nicholson on November 5, 2016 at The Ultimate Fighter Latin America 3 Finale. He won the fight by unanimous decision.

Alvey faced Nate Marquardt on January 28, 2017 at UFC on Fox 23. He won the fight via unanimous decision.

Alvey faced Thales Leites on April 22, 2017 at UFC Fight Night 108. He lost the fight via unanimous decision.

Alvey faced Rashad Evans on August 5, 2017 at UFC Fight Night 114. He won the fight by split decision.

Alvey was tabbed as a short notice replacement for Trevor Smith and faced Ramazan Emeev on 21 October 2017 at UFC Fight Night: Cowboy vs. Till. At the weigh ins, Alvey missed the middleweight limit of 185 pounds, coming in at 189 pounds. As a result, his bout with Emeev was changed to a catchweight and Alvey was fined 20% of his purse. He lost the fight via unanimous decision.

Move up to Light Heavyweight and losing streak
Alvey faced promotional newcomer Marcin Prachnio in a light heavyweight bout on February 24, 2018 at UFC on Fox 28. He won the fight via knockout in the first round.

Alvey faced Gian Villante on June 1, 2018 at UFC Fight Night 131. He won the fight by split decision.

Alvey faced Antônio Rogério Nogueira on September 22, 2018 at UFC Fight Night 137. He lost the fight via knockout in the second round.

Alvey faced Jimmy Crute on February 10, 2019 at UFC 234. He lost the fight via technical knockout in round one.

Alvey faced Klidson Abreu on July 20, 2019 at UFC on ESPN 4. He lost the fight via unanimous decision.

Alvey was expected to face Maurício Rua on November 16, 2019 at UFC Fight Night 164.  However, Alvey was removed from the fight on October 25 due to a broken hand and was replaced by Paul Craig.

Alvey was expected to return to action against Khalil Rountree Jr. on March 28, 2020 at UFC on ESPN: Ngannou vs. Rozenstruik. Due to the COVID-19 pandemic, the event was postponed.

Alvey faced Ryan Spann May 9, 2020 at UFC 249. He lost the fight via split decision.

Alvey faced Jung Da Un on October 24, 2020 at UFC 254. After a back and forth battle, the fight was declared a split draw.

Return to Middleweight and departure
Alvey was expected to move down to middleweight division to face  Zak Cummings on April 10, 2021 at UFC on ABC 2. However, Cummings pulled out of the bout in mid-March and was replaced by Julian Marquez. After getting knocked down, he lost the bout via second round rear-naked choke. This bout earned him a Fight of the Night award.

Alvey was scheduled to face Roman Kopylov on July 31, 2021 at UFC on ESPN 28. However, Kopylov wasn't able to obtain his US visa in time and the bout was scrapped.

Alvey faced Wellington Turman on August 28, 2021 at UFC on ESPN 30. Alvey was poked in the eye multiple times throughout the fight, with Turman being deducted two points, however Alvey lost the fight via split decision.

Alvey was scheduled to face Ian Heinisch on February 5, 2022 at UFC Fight Night 200. Heinisch pulled out due to undisclosed reasons in late December and was replaced by Phil Hawes.  In turn Hawes withdrew from the bout due to an undisclosed injury and he was replaced by Brendan Allen, with the fight taking place at light heavyweight. Alvey lost the fight via rear-naked choke submission in round two.

Alvey faced Michał Oleksiejczuk on August 6, 2022, at UFC on ESPN 40. He lost the fight via technical knockout in round one. With this loss, Alvey extended his winless streak to nine fights in a row, breaking the previous record set by B.J. Penn.

On August 10, 2022 it was announced that Alvey was released from UFC.

Personal life
Alvey has four biological children with his wife McKey Sullivan, winner of the eleventh cycle of America's Next Top Model. In early 2021, they also legally adopted their foster daughter.

Championships and accomplishments
Maximum Fighting Championship
MFC Middleweight Champion (One time)
Ultimate Fighting Championship
Performance of the Night (One time) 
Fight of the Night (One time) 
Second most fights in a period of 12 months (six; tied with Donald Cerrone)
Longest winless streak in UFC history (9)

Mixed martial arts record

|-
|Loss
|align=center|33–18–1 (1)
|Michał Oleksiejczuk
|TKO (punches)
|UFC on ESPN: Santos vs. Hill
|
|align=center|1
|align=center|1:56
|Las Vegas, Nevada, United States
|
|-
|Loss
|align=center|33–17–1 (1)
|Brendan Allen
|Submission (rear-naked choke)
|UFC Fight Night: Hermansson vs. Strickland
| 
|align=center|2
|align=center|2:10
|Las Vegas, Nevada, United States
|
|-
|Loss
|align=center|33–16–1 (1)
|Wellington Turman
|Decision (split)
|UFC on ESPN: Barboza vs. Chikadze
|
|align=center|3
|align=center|5:00
|Las Vegas, Nevada, United States
|
|-
|Loss
|align=center|33–15–1 (1)
|Julian Marquez
|Technical Submission (rear-naked choke)
|UFC on ABC: Vettori vs. Holland
|
|align=center|2
|align=center|2:07
|Las Vegas, Nevada, United States
|
|-
| Draw
|align=center| (1)
|Da Un Jung
|Draw (split)
|UFC 254
|
|align=center|3
|align=center|5:00
|Abu Dhabi, United Arab Emirates
|
|-
|Loss
|align=center|33–14 (1)
|Ryan Spann
|Decision (split)
|UFC 249
|
|align=center|3
|align=center|5:00
|Jacksonville, Florida, United States
|
|-
|Loss
|align=center|33–13 (1)
|Klidson Abreu
|Decision (unanimous)
|UFC on ESPN: dos Anjos vs. Edwards
|
|align=center|3
|align=center|5:00
|San Antonio, Texas, United States
|
|-
|Loss
|align=center|33–12 (1)
|Jimmy Crute
|TKO (punches)
|UFC 234
|
|align=center|1
|align=center|2:49
|Melbourne, Australia 
|
|-
|Loss
|align=center|33–11 (1)
|Antônio Rogério Nogueira
|TKO (punches)
|UFC Fight Night: Santos vs. Anders
|
|align=center|2
|align=center|1:00
|São Paulo, Brazil
|
|-
|Win
|align=center|33–10 (1)
|Gian Villante
|Decision (split) 
|UFC Fight Night: Rivera vs. Moraes
|
|align=center|3
|align=center|5:00
|Utica, New York, United States
|
|- 
|Win
|align=center|32–10 (1)
|Marcin Prachnio
|KO (punch)
|UFC on Fox: Emmett vs. Stephens
|
|align=center|1
|align=center|4:23
|Orlando, Florida, United States
|
|-
|Loss
|align=center|31–10 (1)
|Ramazan Emeev
|Decision (unanimous)
|UFC Fight Night: Cowboy vs. Till
|
|align=center|3
|align=center|5:00
|Gdańsk, Poland
|
|-
|Win
|align=center|31–9 (1)
|Rashad Evans
|Decision (split)
|UFC Fight Night: Pettis vs. Moreno
|
|align=center|3
|align=center|5:00
|Mexico City, Mexico
|
|-
|Loss
|align=center|30–9 (1)
|Thales Leites
|Decision (unanimous)
|UFC Fight Night: Swanson vs. Lobov
|
|align=center|3
|align=center|5:00
|Nashville, Tennessee, United States
|
|-
|Win
|align=center|30–8 (1)
|Nate Marquardt
|Decision (unanimous)
|UFC on Fox: Shevchenko vs. Peña
|
|align=center|3
|align=center|5:00
|Denver, Colorado, United States
|
|-
|Win
|align=center|29–8 (1)
|Alex Nicholson
|Decision (unanimous)
|The Ultimate Fighter Latin America 3 Finale
|
|align=center|3
|align=center|5:00
|Mexico City, Mexico
|
|-
|Win
|align=center|28–8 (1)
|Kevin Casey
|TKO (punches)
|UFC on Fox: Maia vs. Condit
|
|align=center|2
|align=center|4:56
|Vancouver, British Columbia, Canada
|
|-
|Win
|align=center|27–8 (1)
|Eric Spicely
|Submission (guillotine choke)
|UFC Fight Night: McDonald vs. Lineker
|
|align=center|1
|align=center|2:43
|Sioux Falls, South Dakota, United States
|  
|-
|Loss
|align=center| 26–8 (1)
|Elias Theodorou
|Decision (unanimous)
|UFC Fight Night: MacDonald vs. Thompson
|
|align=center|3
|align=center|5:00
|Ottawa, Ontario, Canada
|
|-
| Loss
| align=center| 26–7 (1)
| Derek Brunson
| TKO (punches)
| UFC Fight Night: Teixeira vs. Saint Preux
| 
| align=center| 1
| align=center| 2:19
| Nashville, Tennessee, United States
|
|-
| Win
| align=center| 26–6 (1)
| Dan Kelly
| TKO (punches)
| UFC Fight Night: Miocic vs. Hunt
| 
| align=center| 1
| align=center| 0:49
| Adelaide, Australia
| 
|-
| Win
| align=center| 25–6 (1)
| Cezar Ferreira
| KO (punches)
| UFC Fight Night: Bigfoot vs. Mir
| 
| align=center| 1
| align=center| 3:34
| Porto Alegre, Brazil
| 
|-
| Win
| align=center| 24–6 (1)
| Dylan Andrews
| KO (punches)
| UFC Fight Night: Rockhold vs. Bisping
| 
| align=center| 1
| align=center| 2:16
| Sydney, Australia
| 
|-
| Loss
| align=center| 23–6 (1)
| Tom Watson
| Decision (unanimous)
| UFC Fight Night: Bader vs. St. Preux
| 
| align=center| 3
| align=center| 5:00
| Bangor, Maine, United States
|
|-
| Win
| align=center| 23–5 (1)
| Gerald Meerschaert
| Decision (unanimous)
| NAFC: Mega Brawl
| 
| align=center| 3
| align=center| 5:00
| Milwaukee, Wisconsin, United States
| 
|-
| Win
| align=center| 22–5 (1)
| Wes Swofford
| KO (punch)
| MFC 40
| 
| align=center| 4
| align=center| 1:02
| Edmonton, Alberta, Canada
| 
|-
| Win
| align=center| 21–5 (1)
| Jason South
| TKO (punches)
| MFC 38
| 
| align=center| 5
| align=center| 4:56
| Edmonton, Alberta, Canada
| 
|-
| Win
| align=center| 20–5 (1)
| Jay Silva
| TKO (punches)
| MFC 37
| 
| align=center|3
| align=center|1:05
| Edmonton, Alberta, Canada
|Catchweight (186.6 lb) bout; Silva missed weight.
|-
| Loss
| align=center| 19–5 (1)
| Elvis Mutapčić
| Decision (unanimous)
| MFC 36
| 
| align=center| 5
| align=center| 5:00
| Edmonton, Alberta, Canada
|
|-
| Win
| align=center| 19–4 (1)
| Lucas Lopes
| TKO (punches)
| ShoFight 20
| 
| align=center| 1
| align=center| 1:39
| Springfield, Missouri, United States
| 
|-
| Win
| align=center| 18–4 (1)
| Daniel Almeida
| TKO (knee injury)
| Wreck MMA: Road to Glory
| 
| align=center| 1
| align=center| 1:41
| Gatineau, Quebec, Canada
|Catchweight (190 lb) bout.
|-
| Loss
| align=center| 17–4 (1)
| Brandon Ropati
| Decision (majority)
| ICNZ 16
| 
| align=center| 3
| align=center| 5:00
| Auckland, New Zealand
| 
|-
| Win
| align=center| 17–3 (1)
| Eddie Larrea
| TKO (punches)
| Madtown Throwdown 26
| 
| align=center| 1
| align=center| 4:39
| Madison, Wisconsin, United States
| 
|-
| Win
| align=center| 16–3 (1)
| Augusto Montaño
| Decision (unanimous)
| Chihuahua Extremo
| 
| align=center| 3
| align=center| 5:00
| Chihuahua, Mexico
| 
|-
| Loss
| align=center| 15–3 (1)
| Vitor Vianna
| Decision (split)
| Bellator 50
| 
| align=center|3
| align=center|5:00
| Hollywood, Florida, United States
| Bellator Season 5 Middleweight Tournament Quarterfinal.
|-
| Win
| align=center| 15–2 (1)
| Karl Amoussou
| Decision (split)
| Bellator 45
| 
| align=center|3
| align=center|5:00
| Lake Charles, Louisiana, United States
|
|-
| Win
| align=center| 14–2 (1)
| Jason Guida
| Decision (split)
| NAFC: Bad Blood
| 
| align=center| 3
| align=center| 5:00
| Milwaukee, Wisconsin, United States
| 
|-
| Win
| align=center| 13–2 (1)
| Luke Taylor
| Decision (unanimous)
| Caribbean Ultimate Fist Fighting 1
| 
| align=center| 3
| align=center| 5:00
| Port of Spain, Trinidad and Tobago
| 
|-
| Win
| align=center| 12–2 (1)
| William Hill
| KO (punch)
| KOTC: High Profile
| 
| align=center| 2
| align=center| 2:22
| Lac Du Flambeau, Wisconsin, United States
| 
|-
| Loss
| align=center| 11–2 (1)
| Gerald Meerschaert
| Submission (guillotine choke)
| Combat USA: Championship Tournament Finals
| 
| align=center| 5
| align=center| 4:08
| Green Bay, Wisconsin, United States
| 
|-
| NC
| align=center| 11–1 (1)
| Paul Bradley
| No Contest
| KOTC: Chain Reaction
| 
| align=center| 0
| align=center| 0:00
| Lac Du Flambeau, Wisconsin, United States
| 
|-
| Win
| align=center| 11–1
| Pat O'Malley	
| KO (punches)
| Combat USA 21
| 
| align=center| 1
| align=center| 2:49
| Green Bay, Wisconsin, United States
| 
|-
| Win
| align=center| 10–1
| Brad Resop
| Submission (rear-naked choke)
| Combat USA 17
| 
| align=center| 1
| align=center| 3:40
| Green Bay, Wisconsin, United States
| 
|-
| Win
| align=center| 9–1
| Eric Hammerich
| TKO (punches)
| Madtown Throwdown 22
| 
| align=center| 1
| align=center| 4:05
| Madison, Wisconsin, United States
| 
|-
| Win
| align=center| 8–1
| Demian Decorah
| Decision (unanimous)
| Racine Fight Night 5 
| 
| align=center| 5
| align=center| 5:00
| Racine, Wisconsin, United States
| 
|-
| Win
| align=center| 7–1
| Mark Honneger	
| TKO (doctor stoppage)
| Madtown Throwdown 20
| 
| align=center| 4
| align=center| 5:00
| Madison, Wisconsin, United States
| 
|-
| Win
| align=center| 6–1
| Ron Carter
| Decision (unanimous)
| KOTC: Connection
| 
| align=center| 3
| align=center| 3:00
| Lac Du Flambeau, Wisconsin, United States
| 
|-
| Win
| align=center| 5–1
| Tre Mittnecht	
| TKO (punches)
| Wisconsin Cage Fighting 1: Battle at the Bleachers
| 
| align=center| 1
| align=center| 4:41
| Wind Lake, Wisconsin, United States
| 
|-
| Loss
| align=center| 4–1
| Caleb Nelson	
| Decision (unanimous)
| First Strike
| 
| align=center| 3
| align=center| 3:00
| Manitowoc, Wisconsin United States
| 
|-
| Win
| align=center| 4–0
| Jason Sink
| TKO (punches)
| KOTC: Insanity
| 
| align=center| 1
| align=center| 1:10
| Lac Du Flambeau, Wisconsin, United States
| 
|-
| Win
| align=center| 3–0
| Justin Lemke
| TKO (punches)
| Racine Fight Night 2
| 
| align=center| 2
| align=center| 2:31
| Racine, Wisconsin, United States
| 
|-
| Win
| align=center| 2–0
| Lukas Bowar
| TKO (punches)
| Racine Fight Night 1
| 
| align=center| 1
| align=center| N/A
| Racine, Wisconsin, United States
| 
|-
| Win
| align=center| 1–0
| Shane Malchiodi
| Submission (kimura)
| KOTC: Rock Solid
| 
| align=center| 2
| align=center| 1:19
| Lac Du Flambeau, Wisconsin, United States
|

Mixed martial arts exhibition record

| Loss
| align=center| 1–1
| Joey Rivera
| Decision (majority)
| The Ultimate Fighter: Team Carwin vs. Team Nelson
|  (airdate)
| align=center| 2
| align=center| 5:00
| Las Vegas, Nevada, United States
| 
|-
| Win
| align=center| 1–0
| Leo Kuntz
| KO (punch)
| The Ultimate Fighter: Team Carwin vs. Team Nelson
|  (airdate)
| align=center| 1
| align=center| 0:47
| Las Vegas, Nevada, United States
|

See also
 List of male mixed martial artists

References

External links
 
 

Living people
American male mixed martial artists
Mixed martial artists from Wisconsin
Middleweight mixed martial artists
Mixed martial artists utilizing wrestling
Mixed martial artists utilizing pankration
Mixed martial artists utilizing Brazilian jiu-jitsu
American practitioners of Brazilian jiu-jitsu
1986 births
People from Waterford, Wisconsin
Lakeland College (Wisconsin) alumni
Ultimate Fighting Championship male fighters